Vratsa Peak is a sharp rocky peak rising to 470 m in Breznik Heights, Greenwich Island in the South Shetland Islands, Antarctica surmounting Musala Glacier to the northeast and Targovishte Glacier to the southwest and south.

The feature is named after the city of Vratsa in northwestern Bulgaria.

Location

Maps
 L.L. Ivanov et al. Antarctica: Livingston Island and Greenwich Island, South Shetland Islands. Scale 1:100000 topographic map. Sofia: Antarctic Place-names Commission of Bulgaria, 2005.
 L.L. Ivanov. Antarctica: Livingston Island and Greenwich, Robert, Snow and Smith Islands. Scale 1:120000 topographic map.  Troyan: Manfred Wörner Foundation, 2009.

References
 Vratsa Peak. SCAR Composite Antarctic Gazetteer
 Bulgarian Antarctic Gazetteer. Antarctic Place-names Commission. (details in Bulgarian, basic data in English)

External links
 Vratsa Peak. Copernix satellite image

Mountains of Greenwich Island